Indian Police Force is an upcoming Indian Hindi-language cop action drama streaming series on Amazon Prime Video. The series is created and directed by Rohit Shetty and Sushwanth Prakash. Produced by Rohit Shetty under the banner of Rohit Shetty Picturez and Reliance Entertainment. This series stars Sidharth Malhotra, Shilpa Shetty, and Vivek Oberoi in the lead. The series is set in Shetty's fictional Cop Universe.

Premise 
The series focuses on the life and journey of New Delhi cadre IPS officer 
SP Kabir Malik IPS who will go to any length to track down and bring to justice the terrorist mastermind behind a series of deadly bomb blasts around the country.

Cast 
 Sidharth Malhotra as SP Kabir Malik IPS
 Shilpa Shetty
 Vivek Oberoi as IGP Rathore IPS
 Isha Talwar
 Vibhuti Thakur
 Nikitin Dheer
 Shweta Tiwari
 Sharad Kelkar

Production

Casting 
Sidharth Malhotra was cast in the titular role, and was joined by Shilpa Shetty, Vivek Oberoi and Nikitin Dheer as the leads.

Development 
The series was announced by Rohit Shetty in April 2022. The first look teaser featuring Sidharth Malhotra were unveiled in April 2022 on Amazon Prime Video.

Shilpa, Siddharth and Rohit were spotted at the Mumbai Airport before leaving for Goa, Maharashtra on 9 May 2022.

Filming 
The series were primarily shot in Mumbai, Maharashtra, Goa, Greater Noida. The principal photography of the series started in mid-April 2022. The first schedule kickstarted in Goa from 12 May ended in May 2022 before Shetty left for CapeTown to shoot for Khatron Ke Khiladi 12.

Soundtrack

Release 
On 18 April 2022, Amazon Prime Video announced the series officially, with a first look and teaser being released. The series was initially planned to release in 2023.

See also 
 List of Amazon India originals
 List of Amazon Prime Video original programming

References

External links
 

Hindi-language web series
Upcoming television series